Rosalía Arteaga Serrano (born 5 December 1956) is an Ecuadorian politician who served as the country's first female head of state as acting president for a few days in 1997. Arteaga announced her intention to serve as Secretary-General of the United Nations in the 2021 selection, though incumbent António Guterres was appointed to a second term in office.

Early life and education
Arteaga was born in Cuenca, Ecuador and attended the University of Cuenca.

Presidency
She became Vice President in 1996, following the election of Abdalá Bucaram as President. On 6 February 1997, however, President Bucaram was declared unfit to govern by Congress. Arteaga and congressional leader Fabián Alarcón became locked in a dispute over who should succeed Bucaram since the constitution was vague on the issue. Initially, Alarcón was sworn in with the support of Congress. On 9 February, however, Arteaga, who had insisted that as vice president she should become president, was sworn in instead as Ecuador's first female president. Two days later, however, on 11 February, with the support of Congress and the army, Alarcón was sworn in again, and Arteaga resigned as president and reverted to her post as vice president.

Arteaga continued to clash with Alarcón and resigned from her post as vice president in March 1998. She then ran for president in the elections that were held in May 1998 but received only 3% of the vote.

Post-presidency
Arteaga was secretary-general of the Amazon Cooperation Treaty Organization until 2007 and is a member of the editorial board of the Encyclopædia Britannica. She continues to receive a lifetime pension from the Ecuadorian government of $48.690 annually.

With the support of "Forward", a civil society organization, Arteaga announced her intention to seek the position of Secretary-General of the United Nations in the 2021 selection. However, incumbent António Guterres was successfully appointed to a second consecutive term as Secretary-General.

References

|-

1956 births
Living people
Alfarista Radical Front politicians
Ecuadorian people of Basque descent
Women presidents
People from Cuenca, Ecuador
Presidents of Ecuador
Vice presidents of Ecuador
Women government ministers of Ecuador
Education ministers of Ecuador
Women vice presidents
20th-century Ecuadorian  women politicians
21st-century Ecuadorian women politicians
21st-century Ecuadorian politicians
20th-century Ecuadorian politicians